Rebeca Melissa Fernández Valiente (born 1 December 1991) is a Paraguayan footballer who plays as a forward for Chilean side Club Universidad de Chile. She is a member of the Paraguay women's national team.

International career
Fernández represented Paraguay at the 2008 FIFA U-17 Women's World Cup. At senior level, she played two Copa América Femenina editions (2010 and 2014).

International goals
Scores and results list Paraguay's goal tally first

References

1991 births
Living people
Women's association football forwards
Paraguayan women's footballers
Paraguay women's international footballers
Cerro Porteño players
Santiago Wanderers footballers
Paraguayan expatriate women's footballers
Paraguayan expatriate sportspeople in Chile
Expatriate women's footballers in Chile